Unique, fixed customer codes were used by Boeing Commercial Airplanes to denote the original customer for airframes produced as part of Boeing's 7x7 family of commercial aircraft from 1956 (except for the Boeing 787 Dreamliner), starting with the introduction of the 707, followed by the Boeing 717, Boeing 727, Boeing 737, Boeing 747, Boeing 757, Boeing 767 and Boeing 777 up until 2016.

The codes are in the form of two letters and/or digits which are appended to the aircraft's model designator, as seen in the following examples:
A Boeing 707-100 ordered by Qantas with customer code 38 would be designated as 707-138.
A Boeing 717 ordered by Hawaiian Airlines with customer code 2A would be designated as 717-22A.
A Boeing 727-100 and 727-200 ordered by United Airlines with customer code 22 are designated as 727-022 (not -122) and 727-222 respectively.
A Boeing 737-700 and 737-800 ordered by Southwest Airlines with customer code H4 would be designated as 737-7H4 and 737-8H4 respectively.
A Boeing 747-200B, Boeing 747-400, Boeing 747-8I and Boeing 747-8F ordered by Korean Air with customer code B5 would be designated as, 747-2B5B, 747-4B5, 747-8B5 (not 747-8B5I) and 747-8B5(F) respectively.
A Boeing 747SP ordered by Saudia with customer code 68 would be designated as Boeing 747SP-68 instead of 747-168(SP).
A Boeing 747SR ordered by All Nippon Airways with customer code 81 would be designated as Boeing 747SR-81, instead of 747-181(SR).
A Boeing 757-200 ordered by Delta Air Lines with customer code 32 would be designated as Boeing 757-232.
A Boeing 767-300ER ordered by GECAS with customer code 6N would be designated as Boeing 767-36N(ER).
A Boeing 777-200LR, 777-300, 777-300ER & 777F ordered by Emirates with customer code 1H would be designated as Boeing 777-21H(LR), Boeing 777-31H, Boeing 777-31H(ER) and 777-F1H (not 777-21H(F)) respectively.

The codes do not change if the aircraft is subsequently sold, such as if a passenger aircraft is owned and operated by another airline or converted into a freighter. Several examples are several 777-300s originally built for Emirates with customer code 1H and subsequently sold to Cathay Pacific are still designated at 777-31H, and a Boeing Dreamlifter that was originally built as a 747-400 passenger aircraft for China Airlines with customer code 09 subsequently sold to will be designated as 747-409(LCF) (instead of the original 747-409). Although in some cases if an airline cancelled or sold their order before Boeing had commenced building the airframe, the customer code would be changed to that of the new purchaser. One such example is the order for sixteen 737-800s taken over by Qantas from American Airlines after the September 11 attacks in 2001 - these aircraft were delivered with Qantas' 38 code rather than 23 for American. Also, 2 747-200Bs purchased by British Airways were sold while under construction, to Malaysian Airline System and remained 747-236Bs. Another case is a situation where Boeing sells experimental aircraft to an airline, one example being the first two 777-300ERs built initially as experimental aircraft for Boeing which were subsequently sold to Japan Airlines had their codes changed from 777-300(ER) to 777-346(ER).

Before the 707, Boeing used a generally similar system to identify the presence of detailed variations or options requested by particular customers, but the codes were not customer-specific.

In 2016, Boeing announced that they would no longer apply customer codes to any aircraft produced after a certain point, which would lead to their designators being the "generic" type for the model. The codes were removed from the type certificates for each model with effect from the production line number shown below:
Boeing 737 Next Generation: line number 6082
Boeing P-8 Poseidon: line number 6020
Boeing 747-8: line number 1534
Boeing 767: line number 1102
Boeing 777: line number 1422

Furthermore, customer codes have never been used for Boeing airplane models launched after the termination of customer codes, namely the 787, 737 MAX and 777X.

List
Boeing generally allocated new codes in sequence, with the exception of 01 to 19 being issued after 21 to 99. Code number 20 itself came to be reserved for Boeing's own use, though this was only ever formally the case for the 707.

21 to 99 - First Sequence
01 to 19 - Second Sequence
A0 to Z9 - Third Sequence
0A to 9Z - Fourth Sequence
AA to ZZ - Fifth and final sequence
Airlines in italics are defunct.

Please note that the list of aircraft types for each airline is only those produced with that of the airline's code, and is not intended to reflect their complete operational history.

First sequence

Second sequence

Third sequence

Fourth sequence

Fifth and final sequence

References

Bibliography 

Boeing